Lake Ermistu (also known as Lake Tõstamaa) is a  lake in southwestern Estonia. Administratively it belongs to the Ermistu village in Tõstamaa Parish, Pärnu County.

See also
List of lakes of Estonia
Lake Tõhela, another lake nearby

References

Lakes of Estonia
Tõstamaa Parish
Landforms of Pärnu County